Anastasia Aleksandrovna Chulkova (born 7 March 1985) is a Russian professional racing cyclist.

Major results

Track

2002
 3rd  Keirin, UCI Junior Track Cycling World Championships
2003
 UEC European Junior Track Championships
1st  Points race
3rd  500m time trial
 3rd  Sprint, UCI Junior Track Cycling World Championships
2004
 3rd  Team sprint, 2004 UCI Track Cycling World Cup Classics, Sydney (with Oksana Grishina)
2005
 3rd  Keirin, UEC European Under-23 Track Championships
2006
 2nd  Sprint, UEC European Under-23 Track Championships
2007
 2007–08 UCI Track Cycling World Cup Classics
1st  Team pursuit, Sydney
2nd  Team pursuit, Beijing
3rd  Scratch, Sydney
 3rd  Points race, UEC European Under-23 Track Championships
2008
 2007–08 UCI Track Cycling World Cup Classics
2nd  Team pursuit, Los Angeles
3rd  Scratch, Copenhagen
 3rd  Omnium, UEC European Track Championships
2011
 1st  Scratch, 2010–11 UCI Track Cycling World Cup Classics, Manchester
 2nd  Points race, Summer Universiade
2012
 1st  Points race, UCI Track Cycling World Championships
2013
 2nd Points race, Revolution – Round 1, Manchester
2014
 3rd Points race, Memorial of Alexander Lesnikov
2017
 2nd Points race, Grand Prix of Moscow
2019
 2nd  Scratch, 2019–20 UCI Track Cycling World Cup, Glasgow
 3rd Points race, Grand Prix of Moscow
 3rd Omnium, Grand Prix of Saint Petersburg

Road

2012
 1st Grand Prix of Maykop
 10th Omloop van Borsele
2013
 1st Stage 3 Tour of Adygeya
 1st Stage 3 Trophée d'Or Féminin
 2nd Grand Prix of Maykop
2014
 2nd Grand Prix of Maykop
2015
 6th Overall Tour of Zhoushan Island
1st Mountains classification
1st Stage 3
 7th Overall Tour de Bretagne Féminin
 10th Grand Prix of Maykop

References

External links

1985 births
Living people
Russian female cyclists
Cyclists from Moscow
UCI Track Cycling World Champions (women)
Doping cases in cycling
Russian sportspeople in doping cases
Universiade medalists in cycling
Russian track cyclists
Universiade silver medalists for Russia
Medalists at the 2011 Summer Universiade